Jeremiah Vandyke House, also known as Andrew B. Hankins House, is a historic house located at 87-91 Featherbed Lane, Hopewell Township, Mercer County, New Jersey, United States.

 The home is of interest because it is one of few of this style of home that would have been, at the time, a very common and unremarkable Dutch Colonial fieldstone house. The original stone part of the building measures 29x16 feet and consists of a single room downstairs with a central staircase. The west end of this room has an open fireplace with an oak lintel. The east wall has a smaller fireplace with a simple early 19th century mantel. The exposed ceiling has chamfered hewn oak beams, carrying wide floorboards. Upstairs are two bedrooms and a short hallway.

References

External links 
 National register of historic places 78001769
 Hopewell Township Historic Preservation Plan
 National Park Service Digital Asset Management System
 Township of Hopewell Historic Preservation Commission - GUIDELINES FOR ARCHITECTURAL STYLES
 National Register of Historic Places Inventory - Nomination Form
 Historic Site Survey Report Hopewell Township Mercer County, New Jersey

Buildings and structures in Mercer County, New Jersey
Residential buildings completed in 1706
Residential buildings on the National Register of Historic Places in New Jersey
National Register of Historic Places in Mercer County, New Jersey
Colonial architecture in New Jersey
Hopewell Township, Mercer County, New Jersey